Punnagai is a 1971 Indian Tamil-language drama film directed and written by K. Balachander. It is a remake of the Hindi film Satyakam (1969). The film stars Gemini Ganesan, R. Muthuraman, Nagesh, M. R. R. Vasu and Jayanthi. It was released on 5 November 1971.

Plot 
The story is narrated by Rajbabu, who wants to write a book on the life of his friend, Sathya. Sathya, Rajan, Rajbabu, Mandiramoorthi and Haniff are college-mates in Madras. To celebrate their graduation, they go on a drive around the city in Haniff's car, singing about the ideals of life. The car crashes and Haniff dies, leaving his friends shocked. As time passes, Rajan, Rajbabu and Mandiramoorthi become corrupted in their pursuit of a materialistic lifestyle while Sathya vows to remain a righteous person. He meets Kanchana, a helpless young woman who has been raped and impregnated by a rich predator. She gives birth to a son, Kumar. Sathya marries her and raises Kumar as his own son. Kanchana's rapist later leaves his wealth to Kumar, but Kanchana refuses to take it. Sathya falls ill. His kidneys fail and his friends turn away when the doctor asks if any of them would donate their kidney to him. Sathya ultimately dies, but Kanchana continues to hold on to the values he taught her. Sathya's friends ultimately realize their folly and publish Rajbabu's book with the title Punnagai.

Cast 
 Gemini Ganesan as Sathya
 R. Muthuraman as Rajan
 Nagesh as Rajbabu
M. R. R. Vasu as Mandiramoorthi
V. S. Raghavan as Mohan Ram
 Jayanthi as Kanchana
S. V. Ramadas as the playboy
 A. Sakunthala as Sakunthala
 Baby Mythili as Kumar, Kanchana's son
K.K. Soundar as the interviewer
S. N. Parvathy
 Shoba
 Major Sundarrajan (cameo appearance)
 V. Gopalakrishnan as Haniff (cameo appearance)

Production 
Punnagai is a remake of the Hindi film Satyakam (1969), with some changes made in the screenplay. Although Gemini Ganesan was usually billed with the sobriquet "Kaadhal Mannan" (King of Romance) in film credits, this was the first film where he was billed as "Nadippu Selvam". The film's cinematographer was N. Balakrishnan.

Soundtrack 
Music was by M. S. Viswanathan and lyrics were by Kannadasan.

Reception 
According to historian Randor Guy, the film was not a commercial success, but was considered a classic by critics. He praised the performances of Ganesan, Jayanti, Muthuraman and Sakunthala.

References

External links 
 
 

1970s buddy films
1970s Tamil-language films
1971 films
Films about rape in India
Films based on works by Narayan Sanyal
Films directed by K. Balachander
Films scored by M. S. Viswanathan
Films set in Chennai
Films with screenplays by K. Balachander
Indian black-and-white films
Indian buddy films
Indian drama films
Tamil remakes of Hindi films